Tetramethyllead, also called tetra methyllead and lead tetramethyl, is a chemical compound used as an antiknock additive for gasoline. Its use is being phased out for environmental considerations.

The National Institute for Occupational Safety and Health (NIOSH) in the United States has identified tetramethyllead as a potential workplace hazard. The recommended time-weighted average exposure limit to tetramethyllead is 0.075 milligrams per cubic meter during a 10-hour workday; the OSHA permissible exposure limit is the same value assuming an 8-hour workday.

Exposure to tetramethyllead can affect the central nervous system, the kidneys, and the cardiovascular system. Tetramethyllead can be absorbed through inhalation, through eye contact, through skin absorption, and by ingesting the substance. Symptoms of exposure include insomnia, coma, seizure, mania, delirium, loss of appetite, nausea, hypotension, anxiety, restlessness, and nightmares. First aid measures for exposure include artificial respiration, immediate eye irrigation, and immediate washing with water. Immediate medical attention should be sought if tetramethyllead is ingested.

See also
 Tetraethyllead

References 

Organolead compounds